Argentina competed at the 1992 Summer Olympics in Barcelona, Spain. 84 competitors, 67 men and 17 women, took part in 68 events in 17 sports.

Medalists

Competitors
The following is the list of number of competitors in the Games.

Athletics

Boxing

Key:

RSCH = Referee stopped contest due to head injury

Canoeing

Flatwater

Slalom

Cycling

Eight male cyclists represented Argentina in 1992.

Track
Sprints

Pursuits

Time trials

Points races

Diving

Women

Fencing

Field hockey

Men
Team roster and tournament statistics
Coach: Jorge Ruiz

Legend:         

Preliminary Round (Pool A)

 Qualified for semifinals

9th to 12th place classification

11th place match

Gymnastics

Artistic

Judo

Rowing

Sailing

Men

Women

Key
 PMS – Premature start

Shooting

Swimming

Men

Key

DSQ – Disqualified

Table Tennis

Tennis

Men

Women

Weightlifting

Women

Wrestling

See also
Argentina at the 1991 Pan American Games

References

Olympics
Nations at the 1992 Summer Olympics
1992